Behrouz, Behrooz, Behrus or bihuroz is a Persian given name, loosely meaning prosperous. 

It means "Success" and when translated word by word, it means "[the man who has] good lifetime" (beh: good, rooz: day (and it refers to roozegar: lifetime)). In old Maldivian calendar Bihuroz was the New Year Day, which was the seventh day of Assidha. The name indicates someone that has good days in life, or simply, is prosperous.

People with the name Behrouz
The following people have the given name Behrouz:
Behrouz Afagh, Iranian journalist
Behrooz Astaneh, Iranian Doctor, and medical journal editor
Behrouz Boochani, Kurdish journalist and author
Behrouz Gharibpour, Iranian theater director
Behrouz Nikbin, Iranian scientist
Behrouz Rahbarifar, Iranian football player
Behrouz Soltani, Iranian football player
Behrouz Javid Tehrani, Iranian student and dissident, currently in prison
Behrouz Vossoughi, Iranian actor

Places

Persian masculine given names